Georgetown is an unincorporated community in Marshall County, West Virginia, United States. It is located on County Route 250/14 along the Pennsylvania Fork Fish Creek near the Pennsylvania border.

Unincorporated communities in Marshall County, West Virginia
Unincorporated communities in West Virginia